Mondo is a 1995 French drama film written and directed by Tony Gatlif based upon the short story by J. M. G. Le Clézio.  The film debuted at the Unifrance French Film Festival in Japan 1995, and premiered in France April 17, 1996.

Background
The film's star, Ovidiu Balan, was 11 when the film was shot. He is a Romanian Gypsy who was taken under the director's wing with help of the French government
Gatlif created the film as a work on the themes of the "restless and free" gypsy, in contrast to the notion of settlements proposed for Sinti and Roma populations in the EU. Unlike similar films about street children, such as Salaam Bombay or Pixote, this film was intended as a fairy tale of sorts of a mythical spirit who touches the lives of outcast people in a society filled with prejudice against the gypsies.

Synopsis
The movie follows an orphan boy surviving in Nice through the kindness of strangers and his own ingenuity. One day Mondo (Ovidiu Balan) appears on the streets of Nice. He has no family, no possessions, no schooling, but shares a brilliant smile and good spirit. Being more at home in the city's gardens, fields, and seashore, the bustle of the city seems to overwhelm him. He has good survival instincts, avoiding police and threatening adults in his search for a family.

Cast
 Ovidiu Balan as  Mondo
 Philippe Petit as The Magician
 Pierrette Fesch as Thi Chin
 Jerry Smith as Dadi
 Schahla Aalam as The Magician's Friend
 Maurice Maurin as Giordan the fisherman
 Catherine Brun as Church Soloist
 Ange Gobbi as The Postman
 Jean Ferrier as The Chief of Police
 Marcel Lemuet as The Birdman
 Nadia Cutaia as The Baker Woman
 Pierre Klouman as The Popcorn Man

Recognition

Awards and nominations
 1998, Adult's Jury Award Certificate of Merit for 'Feature Film and Video' at Chicago International Children's Film Festival

Reception
Gatlif's earlier film Latcho Drom presented a romantic portrait of Gypsy music and culture. He brings the same sensibility to this lyrical Mondo, a sad-eyed image of the universal outsider, France's most unwanted. Mondo is described to be  visually reminding one of those rare days when the world used to sparkle as though it were brand new, set in the streets and docks of the French port city of Nice.

References

External links

1995 films
1990s French-language films
French documentary films
Films directed by Tony Gatlif
Films about Romani people
1990s French films